Raymond Hermantier (13 January 1924 – 11 February 2005) was a French actor, born in Lyon, France as Raymond Maroutian.

Raymond Hermantier aspired to act since the age of 17. His training was interrupted by World War II during which he served in the Free French Forces, until the liberation of Paris. Decorated by General Charles de Gaulle, he resumed his acting career immediately after the end of the war. Supported by André Malraux and Albert Camus, he ascended to fame at the Festival de Nîmes, France, in his role of Julius Caesar.

After several movies and theater successes, he was offered the Directorship of the fledgling Senegalese National Theater by the King who aspired to a world-class national theater. This culminated in the National Theater of Senegal being the first African Shakespearean to tour major European capitals in 1974. This success was followed by many successful tours of Europe over the next 13 years.

Filmography

References

External links
 

1924 births
2005 deaths
French military personnel of World War II
French male film actors
French male stage actors